The marathon standings for the top Swedish ice hockey league refers to a summation of the final regular season standings for all seasons of all of the leagues that have functioned as the highest tier of Swedish ice hockey.  This includes Klass I (1922–27), the original Elitserien (1927–35), Svenska Serien (1935–44), Division I (1944–75), and the Swedish Hockey League (SHL) under both its former name (Elitserien, 1975–2013) and its current name (2013 to present).

Standings

References
Swedish Ice Hockey Association: MARATONTABELLEN FÖR HÖGSTA SERIEN EFTER SÄSONGEN 2012/2013.

See also
Marathon SHL standings

Swedish Hockey League
Klass I
Svenska Serien (ice hockey)
Swedish Division I